Pierre-Ange Omombé Epoyo (born 9 March 1995) is a French footballer who plays for  side Peterborough Sports, where he plays as a forward.

Playing career

Paris FC
Omombé played for Paris FC for two seasons between 2015–2017. He played once for the club in a Ligue 2 fixture on 18 December 2015, coming on 67th minute substitute for Bocundji Cá in a 1–1 draw away to Valenciennes.

Peterborough Sports
Omombé moved to England and signed for Southern League Premier Division Central side Peterborough Sports on 16 October 2020.

Career statistics

Club

References

External links

1995 births
Living people
French footballers
Association football forwards
US Orléans players
Paris FC players
Olympique Saint-Quentin players
Limoges FC players
US Raon-l'Étape players
Peterborough Sports F.C. players
Ligue 2 players
Southern Football League players
Black French sportspeople